Good-Loop is an online advertising company that serves adverts for brands whilst raising money for charity. The company currently operates in the UK and EU markets and is headquartered in Edinburgh, Scotland. Clients include Unilever, Kit-Kat, and Coca-Cola.

History
Good-Loop was founded in 2016 by Amy Williams and Daniel Winterstein, with support from Winterstein's previous company. The founders met online when Williams posted an advert looking for someone to help establish an agency which used media money to give to good causes.

Good-Loop works with a number of advertisers, including Unilever, Nestle, and Coca-Cola. The charities it partners with include Wateraid, Carers UK, WWF and Save the Children.

Early funding came from the Collider.io start-up incubator, with follow-on funding raised via crowdsourcing, plus support from Scottish Enterprise (including EU funding), Scottish EDGE, and Innovate UK.

Product
Good-Loop's main product is a form of video advertising. Adverts are shown in online blogs and newspapers. Viewers pick a charity from a shortlist, which then receives a small donation if the video advert is watched. Advertisers are charged on a cost-per-completed-view (CPCV) basis.

Achievements
Good-Loop has won several awards:

 Adtech's Next Big Thing, 2017
 CEO Amy Williams was selected for Forbes 30 under 30 influencers.
 ScotlandIS Digital Tech 2019 – winner for Culture & Leadership
 CTO Daniel Winterstein was named Institute of Directors – Director of the Year Scotland - Start Up, 2019.
 BIMA 2019 Communications & Content (under 70K) award

Good-Loop is an accredited B-Corp.
It has been covered in mainstream press (e.g. BBC, The Herald Scotland, Forbes, The Guardian, The Telegraph, Harper's Bazaar) and industry press (e.g. Campaign, Marketing Week, The Drum).

References

External links 
 

Online advertising
Companies based in Edinburgh
Digital marketing companies of the United Kingdom
Marketing companies established in 2016
B Lab-certified corporations